Stoschek is a surname. Notable people with the surname include:

Erich Stoschek (1903–1985), German athlete
Julia Stoschek (born 1975), German socialite and art collector
Michael Stoschek (born 1947/1948), German businessman
Surnames of German origin

Germanized Slavic family names